

Population 
Chahkowr, also is a village in Alamarvdasht Rural District, Alamarvdasht District, Lamerd County, Fars Province, Iran.
At the Fall of 2016 Census, its population was 1180, in 341 families.

Name 

The name of the Chahkowr: this is why the village is called Chahkowr among the public there are two versions. Some believe the reason that in ancient times, which in the local language Gabr Gore = gowr are pronounced at this point in life have been well-known blind and over time (G) to (k) has become. Some also believe that because of the very large mesquite trees in this location because it is in the local language Mesquite, blind = kowr has been pronounced to the well-known blind.

References 

Chahkowr's Website
Chahkowr's Instagram

Populated places in Lamerd County